Pukkila (Swedish: Pukkila, also ) is a municipality of Finland. It is located in the Uusimaa region.

The municipality is unilingually Finnish. The pukki- part of the municipality's name means "male goat", which is why the name of the municipality literally means the "place of goat". Pukkila has previously also been called Savijoki ("Clay River") and, in local colloquial language, Vähä-Porvoo ("Lesser Porvoo").

In 1962, a former villager, Onni Nurmi, bequeathed the village 760 shares in a company called Nokia - then chiefly known as a manufacturer of rubber workboots - on condition that the income be used for the benefit of the elderly and that the shares would never be sold. After a legal battle the shares have now been diversified and the income used to fund a welfare centre and services for the elderly.

Sights
Pukkila includes the Naarkoski rapids with small waterfalls and fishponds, the Pukkila Church, Pukkila's wild boar garden, and the old and new part of Yado Oikawa's Japanese inn.

Politics
Results of the 2011 Finnish parliamentary election in Pukkila:

Centre Party   41.2%
True Finns   23.0%
National Coalition Party   14.8%
Social Democratic Party   11.1%
Green League   4.2%
Left Alliance   3.4%
Christian Democrats   1.3%
Swedish People's Party   0.3%

See also
 Myrskylä
 Orimattila

References

External links

Municipality of Pukkila – Official website

Municipalities of Uusimaa
Municipalities of Eastern Uusimaa
Populated places established in 1898